Jarandaq (also known as Charandak, Charandan, and Garandeh) is a village in Dodangeh-ye Olya Rural District, Ziaabad District, Takestan County, Qazvin Province, Iran. At the 2006 census, its population was 449, in 117 families.

References 

Populated places in Takestan County